Events in the year 1840 in Bolivia.

Incumbents
President: José Miguel de Velasco Franco

Events

Births
January 14 - Hilarión Daza, President 1876-1879

Deaths

 
1840s in Bolivia